The Tualatin Valley Highway No. 29 (see Oregon highways and routes) is an Oregon highway which passes through the Tualatin Valley, between the cities of McMinnville and Beaverton.  Between McMinnville and Forest Grove, the highway is signed as Oregon Route 47; between Forest Grove and Beaverton it is signed as Oregon Route 8. Oregon 8 becomes Canyon Road in Beaverton east of Hocken Road.

The highway is commonly referred to as TV Highway by locals and is also marked as such by signs.  TriMet bus route 57-TV Hwy. provides public transit service over the full length of the section between Forest Grove and Beaverton.

History

About 1918, a highway constructed of concrete was built between Beaverton and Hillsboro. The highway replaced a dirt road maintained by the county that ran on the southern side of the railroad tracks. This earlier road came from Portland along Farmington Road and veered north on what is now Kinnaman Road in Aloha until 209th Avenue in Reedville where it ran parallel to the rail tracks. Farther west at Witch Hazel the early road then followed the modern Witch Hazel and River Roads into Hillsboro proper. Hillsboro decided in March 1919 to have the new road travel along Baseline Street, two blocks south of Main Street where the road was to run.

In March 1953, Washington County planners decided to have the highway widened to four lanes from Beaverton to Forest Grove. The city of Beaverton paid $5.8 million in urban renewal funds to build an overpass between Murray and 170th Avenue that removed a railroad crossing in 1983.

Major intersections

References

External links
 

Named state highways in Oregon
Transportation in Hillsboro, Oregon
Transportation in Washington County, Oregon
Transportation in Yamhill County, Oregon
Forest Grove, Oregon
1918 establishments in Oregon
Transportation in Beaverton, Oregon
Cornelius, Oregon